The first of two 1948 Buenos Aires Grand Prix (official name:  II Gran Premio del General Juan Perón y de la Ciudad de Buenos Aires) was a Grand Prix motor race held at the Palermo street circuit in Buenos Aires on January 17–18, 1948.

Classification

References

Buenos Aires Grand Prix
Buenos Aires Grand Prix (I)
Buenos Aires Grand Prix